Mustafa Jawda (born 1 July 1992) is an Iraqi footballer who plays as a striker for Al-Zawraa.

Honours

Club
Al-Zawraa
Iraqi Premier League: 2017–18
Iraqi Super Cup: 2017

External links

References

1992 births
Living people
Association football forwards
Iraqi footballers
Iraq international footballers
Al-Zawraa SC players